John Carty (12 August 1950 – 30 January 2014) was an Irish Fianna Fáil politician. He served as a Teachta Dála (TD) from 2002 to 2007 and as a Senator from 2007 to 2011.

From Knock, County Mayo, Carty was elected at the 1999 local elections as a member of Mayo County Council for the Claremorris electoral area. At the 2002 general election, he was elected to Dáil Éireann for the Mayo constituency. He lost his seat at the 2007 general election, but was subsequently elected to the Seanad on the Agricultural Panel. He did not contest the 2011 Seanad election. Carty died on 30 January 2014 at the age of 63. He was married to Kathleen Regan and they had eight children.

References

 

1950 births
2014 deaths
Fianna Fáil TDs
Irish farmers
Local councillors in County Mayo
Members of the 23rd Seanad
Members of the 29th Dáil
Fianna Fáil senators